Hakima Abbas is a political scientist, feminist activist, writer and researcher. She is currently co-executive director of Association for Women's Rights in Development. During the COVID-19 pandemic she advocated for a Just Recovery that includes women. Previously, she was executive director of Fahamu. 

She also was an editor of the Queer African Reader (2013) with Sokari Ekine. The book received as an important piece in international  was an important contribution to feminist and LGBTQ work in Africa.

Edited works 
Feminist Africa, Issue 20: Feminism and Pan-Africanism.

References

External links 
Interview by Deutsche Afrik Stiftung (de)

African feminists
Living people
Year of birth missing (living people)